Kiersztanowo  is a village in the administrative district of Gmina Mrągowo, within Mrągowo County, Warmian-Masurian Voivodeship, in northern Poland.

As a result of the Treaty of Versailles the 1920 East Prussian plebiscite was organized on 11 July 1920 under the control of the League of Nations, which resulted in 360 votes to remain in Germany and none for Poland. 

The village has a population of 140.

References

Villages in Mrągowo County